The Prices and Incomes Accord was an agreement between the Australian Council of Trade Unions and the Australian Labor Party government of Prime Minister Bob Hawke and Treasurer (later Prime Minister) Paul Keating in 1983.  Employers were not party to the Accord.  Unions agreed to restrict wage demands and the government pledged to minimise inflation.  The government was also to act on the social wage.  At its broadest this concept included increased spending on education as well as welfare.

This was seen as a method to reduce inflation without reducing the living standards of Australians.  At the beginning of the Accord, only one union, the New South Wales Nurses Federation, voted against the Accord.  The Accord continued for the whole period of the Labor government through seven stages including, after 1993, enterprise bargaining.

The first Accord secured for all workers a 4.3% pay rise (September 1983), a 4.1% pay rise (April 1984), and a deferred 2.6% pay rise over the initial 3-year period, improvements in family payments and child care, and the introduction of Medicare. Unemployment also fell from over 10% (in the 2nd quarter of 1983) to just under 8%. Other achievements won by the Accord during its first three years included:

The establishment of the Economic Planning Advisory council.
The introduction of the Tripartite Australian manufacturing council, together with other industry councils.
The introduction of a National Occupational Health and Safety Commission.
Increases in family income supplements for low-income families.
Targeted tax cuts for low-income and middle-income workers.
The introduction of various tax avoidance measures.
Increased pensions and unemployment benefits.
The fastest employment and economic growth in the OECD.
The introduction of various steel and vehicle industry plans.
Pay rises of 3.8% (November 1985) and 2.3% (1 July 1986).
The introduction of 3% award superannuation.
 Cut to the top personal tax rate from 60 cents to 47 cents in the dollar.

Original accord: Wages Accord (February 1983)

The original accord was designed to tackle the problem of stagflation and to reduce the number of industrial disputes. It included half-yearly wage increases indexed to the consumer price index (CPI), and supported the introduction of Medicare.

Bob Hawke, Prime Minister of Australia, described the Accord as a centralised system of wage fixation, for the purpose of economic recovery:
As far as wages are concerned, the Government will participate in the conference on wage fixation scheduled to be held in the Conciliation and Arbitration Commission. We will base our approach to that Conference on the conclusions of the Summit and on the prices and incomes accord. In that context, I would point out again that all at the Summit agreed that if a centralised system of wage fixing is to work, there must be an abstention from sectional claims except in special and extraordinary circumstances. Let me say that my Government's interpretation of what constitutes such circumstances is the common -sense interpretation and leaves no room for selfish claims from maverick sections of the trade union movement. Participants at the Summit Conference recognised that if restraint in incomes is to be exercised, then it should be exercised universally. In that spirit of equitable sharing of the burdens of recovery the Summit also stressed the need for restraint in non-wage incomes such as dividends, professional fees and the like.

Accord Mark II (September 1985)
The accord was a reaction to the falling Australian dollar and inflation caused by higher-priced imports.

Accord Mark III (March 1987)
This represented a move from the formally indexed wage rises to a two tier system of wage fixation requiring efficiency offsets in exchange for wage increases.

Source material for accord 3

Accord Mark IV (1988)
Accord Mark IV stressed the Structural-efficiency principle.  It encouraged employers to adopt new ideas like, The Establishment of Career Paths, Broadbanding, Multi-skilling and work patterns and Arrangements.
Source material for accord 4

Accord Mark V (1989)
Wage increases based on implementation of changed Award wages.

Accord Mark VI (February 1990, revised November 1990)

Source material for accord 6

Accord Mark VII (October 1991)
Brought the concept of Enterprise Bargaining.

Accord Mark VIII
Accord Mark VIII was never implemented.
Source material for accord 8

End of the accords

The election of John Howard in 1996 dramatically changed the ideological position of the Australian government. The Liberal government was opposed to any wage fixing. This government's core beliefs were that the free market should determine wages, whilst the government should focus on tight monetary policy and avoid budget deficit. This began a period of increased hostility between the government and the union movement in Australia and marked the end of the Accord period.

Criticism

Criticisms of the Accord come from both the right and the left. Leftist critics claim that it kept real wages stagnant for over ten years. In this view, the Accord was a policy of class collaboration and corporatism. By contrast, right-wing critics claimed that the Accord reduced the flexibility of the wages system. Supporters of the Accord, however, pointed to the significant improvements in the social security system that occurred under the ALP governments, including the introduction of rental assistance for social security recipients, extensions in child-care funding, the creation of useful labour market schemes such as NewStart and Jobs, Education and Training, the introduction of Medicare, the indexation of family allowance payments, and the introduction of the Family Income Supplement for low-income working families. Despite a fall in money wages under the ALP, the social wage of Australian workers was argued to have improved as a result of government reforms in health, social welfare, superannuation, and taxation. 

In addition, the number of industrial disputes fell, while inflation was brought under control. In the lead up to the 1984 budget, unions agreed to a wage/tax trade-off in which they forwent an indexed wage increase in return for a tax cut geared towards low and middle-income earners. Job protection, family leave, and a standard 38-hour workweek had been extended to most workers, whose living standards were protected via superannuation, social wage improvements, and tax cuts. Union members (and indeed, non-union members who were nonetheless covered by union-negotiated collective agreements) and their families benefited from lower inflation, more jobs, maternity allowances, family leave, trade union education, improved access to education, Medicare, superannuation, higher pensions, occupational health and safety improvements, family income supplements, and regular real wage increases from 1991 onwards (after having fallen under Hawke). Collective bargaining rights were enhanced, while an effective minimum wages system was sustained. By 1991, the lowest paid workers received additional increases through the mechanism of supplementary payments. It is arguable that most Australians were a little better off materially on the eve of the 1991 recession than in 1983. By 1991, despite decline in real wage levels under Hawke, household real incomes rose as a result of social wage and employment changes.

Effect on employment
In 1983, the Hon Jim Carlton (Liberal member for Mackellar) argued that the Accord would discourage employment:
Today, in my remarks on this Bill, in particular, I speak on behalf of the unemployed. Again, as I do not represent an existing interest group dependent on government protection or largesse and am not fearful of a cessation of benefits, I do not feel obliged to congratulate the Prime Minister (Mr Hawke) on his capacity to assemble and charm the group of people most likely to provide willing or conscripted endorsement of the disgraceful deal cooked up between the ALP and the Australian Council of Trade Unions before the election. This so-called accord-this deal-was and is a recipe for the continuing exclusion of 10 per cent or more of the work force from the opportunity to earn gainful reward for employment.

The Hon Ralph Willis, Minister for Employment and Industrial Relations argued that things were worse under Malcolm Fraser:
The only policy they had for controlling wages during that period and since has been to use the bludgeon of unemployment to reduce wage claims. That was a deliberate act of policy. The former Government pursued budgetary and monetary policies designed to make it more difficult to advance wage claims. As we saw, under such policies an unemployment rate of 10 per cent was needed to bring wage claims down to their present state, one in which virtually no increases at all are taking place.

The official Australian unemployment rate did fall under the early Accord, reaching a minimum of 6% in 1990, but rapidly increased between 1990 and 1992 as part of the early 1990s recession.

See also
 Early 1990s recession "The recession that Australia had to have".
 Social Contract (Britain)

Notes 

History of Australia (1945–present)
Economic history of Australia